Coleophora tibetana is a moth of the family Coleophoridae. It is found in Tibet.

The wingspan is 18–19 mm.

References

tibetana
Moths of Asia
Moths described in 1989